Kawauchi Station may refer to one of the following railway stations in Japan:

 Kawauchi Station (Iwate) on the Yamada Line
 Kawauchi Station (Miyagi) on the Sendai Subway Tozai Line